The Opua Branch or Otiria-Opua Industrial Line, partially still operational as the Bay of Islands Vintage Railway, is a former section of the North Auckland Line in the Northland Region of New Zealand, between Otiria and the Bay of Islands township of Opua.  The first section was constructed as a bush tramway in 1868 and converted to a railway in the next decade.  Today the railway is partially used by the Bay of Islands Vintage Railway, which runs tourist services between Kawakawa and Taumarere. The line's centrepiece is the section where it runs down along the main street of Kawakawa.

Construction

A tramway was opened in 1868 to carry coal from mines at Kawakawa to the Taumarere wharf at what is now known as Derrick Landing. The rails were wooden, the track gauge was the international standard gauge , and the wagons were pulled by horses.

In 1871, some surplus rails, wagons and two steam locomotives were acquired from a railway project near Auckland and the tramway was upgraded to railway standards.

In 1876, a settlement with a deepwater port was proposed, and in 1881 plans of a town named "Newport" were published.  It became known as Opua and the railway from Kawakawa opened on 7 April 1884.  The spur to Taumarere wharf was no longer necessary, as Opua's port was far superior, and it was closed.

It was some time before the isolated KawakawaOpua line was connected to the rest of the national rail network.  There were questions over its viability, but in 1899 parliament approved a connection with the line that was progressing north from Whangarei.  A line 44 kilometres in length was required to link Kawakawa to the Whangarei section's northern railhead in Waiotu, and factors such as poor winter weather and difficulties in accessing the construction due to the relative isolation of the region at the time meant that it was not until 1911 that the rails from each end met.

In 1925, the North Auckland Line was finally completed and the WhangāreiOpua section was linked to the national network.

Stations

The following stations were on the Otiria-Opua section of the North Auckland Line, with the distance in kilometres from Otiria in brackets:

Moerewa (3 km)
Kawakawa (7 km)
Taumarere (10 km)
Te Akeake (15 km)
Whangae Bridge (16 km)
Opua (19 km)

Operation

In the tramway days and the first years of the line, the predominant traffic was coal from Kawakawa for export.  By the late 1890s coal traffic had all but disappeared and the government initially expressed a desire to remove the line.  Local indignation was such that instead of removing the line, it was connected to Whangarei and then the national network.

When the North Auckland Line was fully opened in 1925, the Opua Express passenger train operated thrice weekly from Auckland to Opua.  Freight did not operate directly to Auckland; it was conveyed to and from Whangarei, with other services operating south.  Some trains were mixed trains, conveying both passengers and freight.

In November 1956, railcars replaced the Opua Express, operating to the other northern terminus of Okaihau on the Okaihau Branch, leaving Opua without any dedicated passenger trains.  Passengers had to rely on mixed trains, which did not connect with the railcars. The mixed trains lasted another two decades while the railcars ceased operating in 1967). The last mixed train ran between Whangarei and Opua on 18 June 1976.  From this time, this part was used to carry solely freight, almost all of which was output from the Moerewa Dairy Factory and Affco Meat Works to the port of Opua.  By the 1980s, regular freight services beyond Kawakawa were becoming irregular due to the decline of shipping to Opua as a result of containerisation.  It was last used in 1985 and leased to the Bay of Islands Vintage Railway to operate tourist passenger services from Opua to Kawakawa, including running down the centre of Kawakawa's main street.

The short stretch between Otiria and Kawakawa was retained as a link to the national network, but has since been dismantled and is now used as a footpath connecting Kawakawa with Moerewa (a disused siding terminates at Moerewa).  The tourist trains operated between Kawakawa and Opua until 2001, when the Land Transport Safety Authority withdrew the line's operating licence.  Currently, operations run from Kawakawa, including the stretch down the main street, to Taumarere. The terminus in Opua is on land now owned by Far North Holdings, the trading arm of Far North District Council, and negotiations are underway so that trains can return to Opua.

See also
North Auckland Line
Dargaville Branch
Donnellys Crossing Section/Branch
Marsden Point Branch
Ōkaihau Branch
Onerahi Branch

References

Citations

Bibliography

External links
1969 timetable
Bay of Islands Vintage Railway homepage
History of Opua
News articles on the revival of the Bay of Islands Vintage Railway

Railway lines in New Zealand
Far North District
Rail transport in the Northland Region
Railway lines opened in 1871
3 ft 6 in gauge railways in New Zealand
Standard gauge railways in New Zealand
Bay of Islands